Jessie Edward Hollins  (January 27, 1970 – July 9, 2009) was a professional baseball player who was a pitcher in the Major Leagues in 1992. He played for the Chicago Cubs. Hollins's body was recovered floating in Lake Livingston on July 10, 2009 after he was reported missing on July 9 while fishing with his son, brother and nephews. Jessie was a father of four (Kendrick, Morgan, Jessie Jr. & Lillian)

References

External links

1970 births
2009 deaths
African-American baseball players
People from Conroe, Texas
Chicago Cubs players
Accidental deaths in Texas
Deaths by drowning in the United States
Major League Baseball pitchers
Baseball players from Texas
Charlotte Knights players
Daytona Cubs players
Gulf Coast Yankees players
Geneva Cubs players
Peoria Chiefs players
Tyler Wildcatters players
Winston-Salem Spirits players
Wytheville Cubs players
20th-century African-American sportspeople
21st-century African-American sportspeople